Saint-Fargeau is a station of the Paris Métro, serving Line 3bis. The station owes its name to its location under Place Saint-Fargeau, which was named after the politician Louis-Michel Lepeletier de Saint-Fargeau (1760-1793) who had participated in the French Revolution and was assassinated in 1793, allegedly for voting for the execution of Louis XVI.

History 
The station opened on 27 November 1921 when line 3 was extended from Gambetta to Porte des Lilas. On 27 March 1971, it was transferred to line 3bis on its establishment when line 3 was extended from Gambetta to Gallieni. As part of the "Un métro + beau" programme by the RATP, the station was renovated and modernised on 12 November 2003.

In 2019, the station was used by 716,699 passengers, making it the 294th busiest of the Métro network out of 302 stations.

In 2020, the station was used by 339,164 passengers amidst the COVID-19 pandemic, making it the 294h busiest of the Métro network out of 305 stations.

Passenger services

Access 
The station has a single entrance at Place Saint-Fargeau with an original surface building designed by Charles Plumet, like the two adjacent stations Pelleport and Porte des Lilas.

Station layout

Platforms 
The station has a standard configuration with 2 tracks surrounded by 2 side platforms. Due to its significant depth, 2 lifts are provided along with stairs to its entrance.

Other connections 
The station is also served by lines 61, 64, and 96 of the RATP bus network.

Gallery

References

Roland, Gérard (2003). Stations de métro. D’Abbesses à Wagram. Éditions Bonneton.

Paris Métro line 3bis
Paris Métro stations in the 20th arrondissement of Paris
Railway stations in France opened in 1921
Articles containing video clips
Art Deco architecture in France